The University Credit Union Center (previously known as Recreation Hall and The Pavilion at the ARC and commonly known as The Pavilion) is an 7,600-seat indoor multi-purpose stadium on the campus of the University of California, Davis in unincorporated Yolo County, California.

History and renovations
Recreation Hall was opened in 1977 for intercollegiate athletics, as well as other large events such as intramural sports and public events.  The capacity of the University Credit Union Center for basketball is over 6,000 people and can provide  of floorspace.

In Spring of 2004, UC Davis opened the Activities and Recreation Center (ARC).  This structure served as a massive extension to the currently existing Pavilion.  Since the two buildings have been fused into one massive complex, Recreation Hall's name was changed to The Pavilion at ARC upon the opening of the ARC in 2004.

As of July 2021, the Pavilion is known as the University Credit Union Center for sponsorship reasons. As part of UC Davis' 10-year sponsorship agreement with University Credit Union, a Daktronics videoboard was added to provide game statistics and live replays for Aggie sporting events.

Tenants
The main tenants of The Pavilion are the UC Davis Aggies athletic programs. The UC Davis Aggies men's basketball, women's basketball, women's volleyball and women's gymnastics teams call The Pavilion home.

It was the home of the UC Davis Aggies wrestling team until the program was discontinued in 2010.

Break the Record Night
An annual "Break the Record Night" is held during each basketball season to attempt to break the prior attendance record for a basketball game.  The current record of 7,926 was set on January 23, 1999, when UC Davis defeated Chico State 102–71. Due to changes in seating configuration however, this record is no longer attainable.

Other events
Former President Bill Clinton visited UC Davis to gain support for his wife Hillary Clinton's presidential nomination in 2008. Around 7,800 people were in attendance with a reported 3,500 more turned away at the door.

World Wrestling Entertainment have also held shows at The Pavilion.

See also
 List of NCAA Division I basketball arenas

References

External links
 UC Davis athletics facilities
 UC Davis campus recreation

University of California, Davis campus
Indoor arenas in California
Sports venues in Yolo County, California
Basketball venues in California
Gymnastics venues in California
College basketball venues in the United States
College volleyball venues in the United States
UC Davis Aggies men's basketball
University and college student recreation centers in the United States
Volleyball venues in California
Wrestling venues in California
Sports venues completed in 1977
1977 establishments in California